The 1982 Eastern 8 men's basketball tournament was the sixth annual postseason tournament of the Eastern Athletic Association, popularly known as the Eastern 8. This was also the last tournament to be branded as "Eastern 8"; in the following school year, the conference adopted its current name, the Atlantic 10 Conference. The first round was held at campus sites and the semifinals and final were held in Pittsburgh at the Civic Arena. Pittsburgh defeated West Virginia 79-72 to win their second tournament championship. Clyde Vaughan of Pittsburgh was named the Most Outstanding Player of the tournament.

Bracket

External links
  Atlantic 10 Men's Basketball Tournament History 

Atlantic 10 men's basketball tournament
Tournament
Eastern 8 men's basketball tournament
Eastern 8 men's basketball tournament